Mahrawali is a village in the Punjab province of Pakistan. It is located at 30°47'0N 74°12'35E with an altitude of 176 metres (580 feet).

References

Villages in Punjab, Pakistan